The Tai Tam Reservoirs, also known as Tai Tam Reservoir Group, is a group of reservoirs located in the Tai Tam Country Park in the eastern part of Hong Kong Island in Hong Kong. The four reservoirs have a total storage capacity of 6.2 million cubic metres. They are managed by Water Supplies Department of Hong Kong Government.

The reservoirs consist of:
 Tai Tam Upper Reservoir, 
 Tai Tam Byewash Reservoir,
 Tai Tam Intermediate Reservoir  and
 Tai Tam Tuk Reservoir .

The upper and byewash reservoirs are jointly known as Tai Tam Reservoir.

Geography
The reservoirs are surrounded by Mount Butler, Jardine's Lookout, Violet Hill and Mount Parker, with an extraordinary environment of peace and quiet.

History
The planning of the reservoirs is known as Tai Tam Scheme which was started early in 1872 and was shelved in 1874 because of economic depression. The scheme was continued later in 1882 and virtually completed in 1888. Yet again, the supply was proved insufficient and the building of the Tai Tam Tuk dam began in 1912.

Tai Tam Tuk Reservoir
As part of the Tai Tam scheme, the colonial government commenced the construction of Tai Tam Tuk Reservoir in 1912, the project was completed in 1917, cost 2.46 million Hong Kong dollars and had a 1.42 - billion - gallon capacity upon completion. The dam, designed by Daniel Jaffe, was 60 feet tall and 800 feet wide, 12 arches supported by half round granite columns were also built to prop up the Tai Tam Road connecting Stanley and Chai Wan. Governor Henry May officially announced the completion of the reservoir on 2 February 1918 and the reservoir operates until now.

Conservation

Heritage Trail
In September 2009, the Tai Tam Waterworks Heritage Trail was opened, touring the architectural landmarks of the reservoir system. Placards describe the features, giving insights into the work involved in the construction of what the source of most of Hong Kong Island's fresh water supply.

Declared Monuments
Twenty two facilities surrounding Tai Tam Tuk reservoir were declared as monuments in 2009, including pumping stations, masonry bridges, the memorial stone, the value house and the dam itself.

A list of the facilities declared Monument:

Transportation
A restricted road, Tai Tam Reservoir Road, links reservoirs from Wong Nai Chung Gap to Tai Tam.

References

External links

Water Supplies Department, Hong Kong
Tai Tam Country Park (in Chinese)